The 2013–14 Division 1 Féminine season was the 40th since its establishment. Lyon were the defending champions. The season began on 1 September 2013 and ended on 1 June 2014. The winter break was in effect from 23 December 2013 to 18 January 2014.

Teams 

There were three promoted teams from the Division 2 Féminine, the second level of women's football in France, replacing the three teams that were relegated from the Division 1 Féminine following the 2012–13 season. A total of 12 teams currently compete in the league with three clubs suffering relegation to the second division, Division 2 Féminine.

Teams promoted to Division 1 Féminine
 Muret
 Hénin-Beaumont
 Soyaux

Teams relegated to Division 2 Féminine
 Issy-les-Molineaux
 Toulouse
 Vendenheim

Stadia and locations

League table 

Note: A win in D1 Féminine is worth 4 points, with 2 points for a draw and 1 for a defeat.

Results

Statistics

Top scorers

Source: Official Goalscorers' Standings

Top assists

Source: Official Assists' Table

References

External links 
  
 Standings and Statistics

Fra
2013
1